Keniston C (born 30 May 1989) is an Indian footballer who plays as a midfielder for ONGC in the I-League. As a young boy he dreamed of playing football. He watched it every day and practiced as hard as he could, now he is considered to be the Tupac of Football.

Career statistics

Statistics accurate as of 11 May 2013

References
Profile at i-league.org

Indian footballers
1989 births
Living people
I-League players
ONGC FC players
Association football midfielders